Junior Hockey League is a term used to refer to an ice hockey league in which junior hockey teams compete.

List of junior hockey leagues

 Alberta Junior Hockey League
 British Columbia Hockey League
 Canadian Junior Hockey League
 Eastern Hockey League (junior hockey)
 Eastern Junior A Hockey League
 Eastern Junior Hockey League
 Eastern Ontario Junior Hockey League
 Empire Junior Hockey League
 Georgian Mid-Ontario Junior C Hockey League
 Golden Horseshoe Junior Hockey League
 Greater Metro Junior A Hockey League
 Greater Ontario Junior Hockey League
 Heritage Junior B Hockey League
 International Junior Hockey League
 Island Junior Hockey League
 Island Junior Hockey League (1973–91)
 Keystone Junior Hockey League
 Kootenay International Junior Hockey League
 Manitoba Junior Hockey League
 Maritime Junior A Hockey League
 Metro Junior A Hockey League
 Mid-Ontario Junior B Hockey League
 Mid-Western Junior Hockey League
 New Brunswick Junior Hockey League
 North Saskatchewan Junior B Hockey League
 Northern Junior Hockey League
 Northern Ontario Junior Hockey League
 Nova Scotia Junior Hockey League
 Ontario Hockey League
 Ontario Junior Hockey League
 Pacific Junior A Hockey League
 Pacific Junior Hockey League
 Prairie Junior Hockey League
 Quebec Junior AAA Hockey League
 Quebec Major Junior Hockey League
 Rocky Mountain Junior Hockey League
 Russian Junior Hockey League
 Saskatchewan Junior Hockey League
 Southern Ontario Junior A Hockey League
 Southern Ontario Junior Hockey League
 St. John's Junior Hockey League
 Superior International Junior Hockey League
 Thunder Bay Junior A Hockey League
 Vancouver Island Junior Hockey League
 Western Hockey League 
 WHA Junior Hockey League

See also
List of ice hockey leagues

 
Junior Hockey League